Chesterfield Museum and Art Gallery is a local museum and art gallery in the town of Chesterfield, Derbyshire, England.

The hall was named in honour of the British railway pioneer George Stephenson and the museum has a small collection of objects relating to Stephenson and his family. The museum is across the road from the Church of St Mary and All Saints, the parish church more popularly known as the Crooked Spire.

The museum, established in 1994,  presents the history of Chesterfield from its origins as a Roman fort to the present. It is located on St Mary's Gate in the Stephenson Memorial Hall, dating from 1879 and originally built as a mechanics institute. Later this part of the building was used for the town's public library.

Chesterfield Museum is owned and operated by Chesterfield Borough Council.

See also 
 List of museums in Derbyshire

References

External links 
Chesterfield Museum
Chesterfield Borough Council

School buildings completed in 1879
Museums established in 1994
1994 establishments in England
Museums in Derbyshire
Local museums in Derbyshire
Art museums and galleries in Derbyshire
Buildings and structures in Chesterfield, Derbyshire